Baby, You Can Get Your Gun! is an album by the American blues musician Snooks Eaglin, released in 1987. It was regarded as a comeback for Eaglin, who had not put out an album since 1978.

Production
The backing musicians, in part pulled from Fats Domino's band, were considered to be some of New Orleans' best sidemen. Baby, You Can Get Your Gun! was produced by Hammond Scott.

Critical reception

The Washington Post wrote that "shuffle tunes like 'Oh Sweetness' roll with rhumba rhythms and the headlong momentum of a good Professor Longhair arrangement, and Eaglin even manages to detonate some James Brown funk on 'Drop That Bomb!'" The Los Angeles Times thought that Eaglin's "cognac-smooth vocals get down to serious business on the wryly twisted blues 'That Certain Door' and 'You Give Me Nothing but the Blues'." The Boston Globe opined that "Eaglin's pleasant voice and relaxed guitar preside over a potpourri of New Orleans styles."

AllMusic called the album "an earthly delight; [Eaglin's] utterly unpredictable guitar weaves and darts through supple rhythms provided by New Orleans vets Smokey Johnson on drums and Erving Charles, Jr. on bass." The Rolling Stone Album Guide deemed it "tough and rollicking."

Track listing

Personnel
Snooks Eaglin - guitar, vocals
Erving Charles, Jr. - bass
Ronnie Earl - guitar
Smokey Johnson - drums
David Lastie - saxophone
Ron Levy - keyboards

References

Snooks Eaglin albums
1987 albums
Black Top Records albums